Seruantztian was a region and family of the old Armenia c. 400–800.

The rulers about 451 were Khurs and Garegin Seruantztian.

See also
List of regions of old Armenia

Early medieval Armenian regions